William Thomas Molloy  (July 27, 1940 – July 2, 2019) was a Canadian lawyer, treaty negotiator, and Chancellor of the University of Saskatchewan. He was the 22nd Lieutenant Governor of Saskatchewan, the viceregal representative of Queen Elizabeth II of Canada in the Province of Saskatchewan. 

Molloy was appointed Lieutenant Governor by the Governor General of Canada, Julie Payette, on the advice of Prime Minister Justin Trudeau on January 22, 2018, to succeed Vaughn Solomon Schofield. He was sworn in on March 21, 2018, at the Saskatchewan Legislative Building. He died of pancreatic cancer just over a year later, on July 2, 2019.  The Province of Saskatchewan accorded Molloy a state memorial service on July 13, 2019.

Biography
Born in Saskatoon, Saskatchewan, on July 27, 1940, Molloy received a Bachelor of Arts degree from St. Thomas More College and a Bachelor of Laws degree from the University of Saskatchewan both in 1964. He was called to the Bar in both Saskatchewan and Alberta.  He was counsel with the Saskatoon law firm of Molloy Negotiations.

He was the Chief Negotiator for the Government of Canada in the Nunavut Land Claim Agreement, and for the Nisga'a Final Agreement.

He was the author of the book, The World Is Our Witness: The Historic Journey of the Nisga'a into Canada.

In 1996, he was made an Officer of the Order of Canada for "his integrity, commitment to a just settlement and personable rapport". In 2012, he was made a Member of the Saskatchewan Order of Merit.

On January 22, 2018, Prime Minister Justin Trudeau announced Molloy's appointment as the next Lieutenant Governor of Saskatchewan, to succeed Vaughn Solomon Schofield. He was formally installed on March 21, 2018.

On May 7, 2019, Molloy's office announced that he had been diagnosed with pancreatic cancer and was stepping away from his post to undergo treatment, with his duties temporarily being taken over by Robert G. Richards, Chief Justice of Saskatchewan. He died of the disease on July 2, 2019.

On July 13, 2019, the Province of Saskatchewan accorded a state memorial service to Molloy in Saskatoon.  Amongst those attending were the Governor General, Julie Payette; the Premier of Saskatchewan, Scott Moe; the federal Minister of Public Safety, Ralph Goodale; former Premier Roy Romanow, who was a classmate of Molloy at the University of Saskatchewan; and Perry Bellegarde, National Chief of the Assembly of First Nations.

Honours and Arms

Honours 

  Officer of the Order of Canada
  Knight of the Order of St John
  Member of the Saskatchewan Order of Merit

Coat of Arms 
Molloy was granted a coat of arms by the Canadian Heraldic Authority on May 15, 2019 through Grant of Arms and Supporters, with differences to Corinne Anne Molloy, Jennifer Lee Molloy, Alison Marie Molloy and Kathryn Burke Molloy.

References
  

1940 births
2019 deaths
21st-century Canadian politicians
Canadian King's Counsel
Chancellors of the University of Saskatchewan
Deaths from pancreatic cancer
Lawyers in Saskatchewan
Lieutenant Governors of Saskatchewan
Officers of the Order of Canada
People from Saskatoon
University of Saskatchewan alumni
University of Saskatchewan College of Law alumni